Lynn Harold Hough (1877–1971) was an American Methodist clergyman, theologian, and academic administrator. He served as the president of Northwestern University from 1919 to 1920.

Early life and education
Lynn H. Hough was born on September 10, 1877, in Cadiz, Ohio. He earned a bachelor's degree from Scio College in 1898 and Drew University in 1905, followed by a doctorate from Garrett Biblical Institute in 1918.

Career
Hough began his career as a Methodist clergyman in the Northeast in 1898, up until 1914.

Hough taught at his alma mater, Garrett Biblical Institute, from 1914 to 1919. He succeeded Thomas Holgate as the president of Northwestern University from 1919 to 1920. During his tenure, he approved a new Master of Business Administration degree program in the School of Commerce (now known as the Kellogg School of Management) and he began a $25-million fundraising campaign to expand the campus.

Hough was a professor at his alma mater's Drew Theological Seminary from 1930 to 1934, and its dean from 1934 to 1947. He authored several books about Christianity.

 The Significance Of The Protestant Reformation (Abdingdon Press, 1918)

Personal life and death
In 1936, Hough married Blanche Horton; she predeceased him in 1970. He resided at 1165 Fifth Avenue on the island of Manhattan, New York City, where he died on July 14, 1971.

See also
 Christian Flag

References

Footnotes

Bibliography

Further reading

 

1877 births
1971 deaths
Academics from New York (state)
Academics from Ohio
American Christian theologians
American Freemasons
American United Methodist clergy
Christian humanists
Christians from New York (state)
Christians from Ohio
Clergy from New York City
Drew University faculty
Drew University alumni
Garrett–Evangelical Theological Seminary alumni
Methodist theologians
Northwestern University faculty
People from Cadiz, Ohio
People from the Upper East Side
Presidents of Northwestern University
Religious leaders from Ohio